Kirby is an unincorporated community in Van Buren Township, Monroe County, in the U.S. state of Indiana.

History
The community was named after a family arrived in present-day Kirby.

Geography

References

Unincorporated communities in Monroe County, Indiana
Unincorporated communities in Indiana
Bloomington metropolitan area, Indiana